Sandy Ridge Township, population 45,672, is one of nine townships in Union County, North Carolina. This township contains the towns of Waxhaw, Weddington, Mineral Springs, and Stallings. The villages of Marvin and Wesley Chapel are also located here.

Geography
Twelvemile Creek and its tributaries drain most of the township except for the very northwestern part, which is drained by Sixmile Creek.  Tributaries to Twelvemile Creek include: Blythe Creek, West Fork Twelvemile Creek, Bates Branch, Little Twelvemile Creek, Price Mill Creek, East Fork Twelvemile Creek, Molly Branch, and Tarkill Branch.  Sixmile Creek has the tributaries of Marvin Branch and McBride Branch.

References

Townships in Union County, North Carolina
Townships in North Carolina